Bræk is a Norwegian surname. Notable people with the surname include: 

 Lise Skjåk Bræk (born 1941), Norwegian textile artist, daughter of Ola
 Ola Skjåk Bræk (1912–1999), Norwegian banker and politician

Norwegian-language surnames